Richard Madox was an English explorer.

Richard Mad(d)ox or Maddocks may also refer to:

Richard Madox Bromley, civil servant
Richard Leach Maddox, photographer and physician
Richard Maddocks, Australian cricketer
Rick Maddocks, Canadian author